Danville National Cemetery is a United States National Cemetery located in the city of Danville, Virginia. Administered by the United States Department of Veterans Affairs, it encompasses  and, as of the end of 2005, it had 2,282 interments. It is managed by Salisbury National Cemetery.

History 
This was part of the process to recognize and commemorate the military dead. Almost all of the original interments were Union prisoners-of-war who had been held in the city of Danville. Tobacco warehouses were converted into Confederate internment facilities for this purpose.

Most of the Union prisoners, as was the case for soldiers throughout the war, died of infectious diseases and malnutrition. These soldiers were initially buried in poorly marked, mass graves. They were later exhumed and reinterred with individual markers. Soldiers were from numerous states, including Ohio, Illinois, Pennsylvania, Massachusetts, New York, New Jersey, and Wisconsin. The cemetery is open to visitors throughout the year.

Danville National Cemetery was listed on the National Register of Historic Places in 1995.

References

External links

 National Cemetery Administration
 Danville National Cemetery
 
 
 Danville National Cemetery at Find a Grave

Cemeteries on the National Register of Historic Places in Virginia
United States national cemeteries
Virginia in the American Civil War
National Register of Historic Places in Danville, Virginia
Danville, Virginia
Tourist attractions in Danville, Virginia
Historic American Landscapes Survey in Virginia